Ajaip Singh Matharu (born 11 March 1938) is an Indian-born Ugandan field hockey player. He competed in the men's tournament at the 1972 Summer Olympics.

References

External links
 

1938 births
Living people
People from Ludhiana district
Indian emigrants to Uganda
Ugandan people of Indian descent
Ugandan people of Punjabi descent
Ugandan male field hockey players
Olympic field hockey players of Uganda
Field hockey players at the 1972 Summer Olympics